In mathematics, a Chevalley basis for a simple complex Lie algebra is a basis constructed by Claude Chevalley with the property that all structure constants are integers. Chevalley used these bases to construct analogues of Lie groups over finite fields, called Chevalley groups.  The Chevalley basis is the Cartan-Weyl basis, but with a different normalization.

The generators of a Lie group are split into the generators H and E indexed by simple roots and their negatives . The Cartan-Weyl basis may be written as

One may perform a change of basis to define

The Cartan integers are

 
The resulting relations among the generators are the following:

where in the last relation  is the greatest positive integer such that  is a root and we consider  if  is not a root.

For determining the sign in the last relation one fixes an ordering of roots which respects addition, i.e., if  then  provided that all four are roots. The sign in the last relation can be chosen arbitrarily whenever  is an extraspecial pair of roots. This then determines the signs for all remaining pairs of roots.

References

Lie groups
Lie algebras